Rhytipterna is a genus of bird in the tyrant flycatcher family Tyrannidae. They share the common name "mourner" with several species in the family Tityridae.

The genus contains three species:

References

 
Tyrannidae
Bird genera
Taxonomy articles created by Polbot
Taxa named by Ludwig Reichenbach